Edward Brown was a carpenter and state legislator in Texas. He lived in Rusk County, Texas and served in 1874 as a representative of a two county district of Harrison County and Rusk County. He served along with Webster Flanagan in the State Senate and Shack Roberts from Harrison County.

References

People from Rusk County, Texas
People from Harrison County, Texas
Members of the Texas House of Representatives
19th-century American politicians
Texas state senators
Year of birth missing
Year of death missing